Tossing Ship (French: Coups de roulis) is a 1932 French musical comedy film directed by Jean de La Cour and starring Max Dearly, Edith Manet and Pierre Magnier. It is an operetta film based on the stage work Coups de roulis by André Messager.

Cast

References

Bibliography 
 Crisp, Colin. Genre, Myth and Convention in the French Cinema, 1929-1939. Indiana University Press, 2002.

External links 
 

1932 films
1932 musical comedy films
French musical comedy films
Operetta films
1930s French-language films
French black-and-white films
1930s French films